Paul Croce Paris (August 7, 1930 - January 15, 2017) was an American academic, engineering consultant and researcher in the field of mechanics and fatigue. He was known particularly for introducing fracture mechanics methods to the aviation industry, and for the empirical Paris' law relating crack growth rate to the amplitude of the stress intensity factor.

Career 
Paris was trained in applied mechanics at Lehigh University. He was a faculty associate at Boeing in the summer of 1955, where he investigated the Comet fatigue (material) failure. His first paper on fracture mechanics was famously rejected by top journals. Paris joined Washington University in St. Louis in 1976. In 2009 he became a professor emeritus and continued to teach.

Awards 
 Honorary Doctorate from Paris Nanterre University
 2003 Crichlow Trust Prize by the American Institute of Aeronautics and Astronautics 
 2009 George Irwin Gold Medal by the International Conference on Fracture at Ottawa, Canada
 2016 August-Wöhler Medal by the European Structural Integrity Society (ESIS)

References

External links
Parks College
Eulogy

1930 births
2017 deaths
Lehigh University alumni
Washington University in St. Louis faculty